Fryčovice is a municipality and village in Frýdek-Místek District in the Moravian-Silesian Region of the Czech Republic. It has about 2,400 inhabitants.

Administrative parts
The village of Ptáčník is an administrative part of Fryčovice.

History
The first written mention of Fryčovice is from 1267.

Notable people
Lubomír Havlák (1921–2014), opera singer

References

Villages in Frýdek-Místek District